Panjagān was either a projectile weapon or an archery technique used by the late military of Sasanian Persia, by which a volley of five arrows was fired. No examples of the device have survived, but it is alluded to by later Islamic authors, in particular, in their description of the Persian conquest of Yemen, where the application of the exotic panjagan was supposedly the deciding factor in Persian victory.

Name

The name panjagān (Middle Persian for "five-fold") is reconstructed from its Arabized forms recorded by the Islamic authors al-Tabari ( banjakān,  fanjaqān), al-Jahiz, and al-Maqdisi ( fanrajān). The word banjakiyya ("a volley of five arrows") mentioned by al-Jawaliqi is also related.

History

Al-Tabari records the use of panjagān by the Sasanian army during the Yemeni campaign of Wahriz against the Aksumites of Ethiopia, noting that the latter had not encountered it before. The author makes another allusion when describing the assault by the Persian asāwira (descendants of the Sasanian aswārān heavy cavalry) that killed Mas'ud ibn Amr, the governor of Basra, in 684 AD during the Second Islamic Civil War. As the advance of the 400-strong asāwira cavalry was halted by spearmen in the street, the Persian commander Māh-Afrīdūn ordered to shoot by "fanjaqān", thus they hit them with "2,000 arrows in one burst", forcing the spearmen to retreat.

Analysis

A. Siddiqi has translated the word as five-pointed/five-barbed arrow, but C. E. Bosworth consider this interpretation unlikely. Bosworth proposed that the term refers to a military technique of rapid firing of five arrows in succession. However, Ahmad Tafazzoli's analysis of Middle Persian military terminology suggests that it was actually a device, probably a type of crossbow. Furthermore, a device capable of shooting five arrows simultaneously has been described in the work of Ā'īn-Nāmah. According to Kaveh Farrokh, use of the panjagan allowed the archer to shoot with greater speed, volume, and focus, creating a "kill zone". Thus, it may have been developed for the wars against the Göktürks and the Hephthalites, who were known for their agile cavalrymen.

See also
Repeating crossbow, an ancient Chinese weapon
Mad minute, a pre-WWI British military exercise for rapid firing and reloading

References

Medieval archery
Projectile weapons
Crossbows
Military equipment of Asia
Weapons of Iran
Ancient weapons
Medieval weapons
Military history of the Sasanian Empire
Lost inventions